Sergey Korsak (born 24 February 1989) is a Belarusian footballer.

On 6 August 2020, the BFF banned Korsak from Belarusian football for 2 years for his involvement in the match fixing.

References

External links
 
 

1989 births
Living people
Belarusian footballers
Association football midfielders
FC Partizan Minsk players
FC Smorgon players
FC Naftan Novopolotsk players
FC Molodechno players
FC Slutsk players
FC Gorodeya players
FC Uzda players
FC Krumkachy Minsk players
FC Torpedo Minsk players
FC Lida players
FC Dnepr Rogachev players